HDMI Licensing, LLC was founded by Hitachi, Panasonic, Philips, Silicon Image, Sony, Thomson (RCA) and Toshiba; it is their licensing vehicle for the HDMI standard.

External links
HDMI Licensing, LLC
HDMI Final brochure and the HDMI 1.3 Update

Licensing
Film and video technology
Technology companies established in 2002
2002 establishments in the United States
Organizations based in San Jose, California